The John Andrew and Sara Macumber Ice House is a historic building located on a farmstead southwest of Winterset, Iowa, United States.  The Macumbers were natives of Gallia County, Ohio, and settled in Madison County in 1853.  This building is a fine example of a vernacular limestone farm outbuilding. The single-story, one-room structure is composed of coursed rough cut stone on the main facade, and uncoursed rubble is used on the other elevations.  It features quoins and jambs of roughly squared quarry faced stones on the main facade.  There is a door on the south gable end, two metal ventilation pipes on the ridge of the roof, and no windows.  Built sometime between 1875 and 1885, it is the only stone ice house known to exist in Madison County, and it is one of the few outbuildings built of stone.  The ice house is located next to the garage, behind the house.  It was listed on the National Register of Historic Places in 1993.

References

Vernacular architecture in Iowa
Buildings and structures in Madison County, Iowa
National Register of Historic Places in Madison County, Iowa
Agricultural buildings and structures on the National Register of Historic Places in Iowa